Acute eosinophilic pneumonia is the acute-onset form of eosinophilic pneumonia, a lung disease caused by the buildup of eosinophils, a type of white blood cell, in the lungs. It is characterized by a rapid onset of shortness of breath, cough, fatigue, night sweats, and weight loss. Though the underlying cause is unknown, it can be triggered by a change in medication or tobacco smoking. It is treated with corticosteroids and has a favorable prognosis.

References 

Rare diseases
Lung disorders